Cennet may refer to:
 Cennet, Turkish for "paradise"
 Cennet'in Gözyaşları, Turkish drama television series
 Cennet and Cehennem, two large sinkholes in the Taurus Mountains, in Mersin Province, Turkey
 Cennet, Fındıklı, village in the Fındıklı, Rize Province, in Black Sea Region of Turkey